Myrna Veenstra (born 4 March 1975) is a former field hockey player from the Netherlands. She was born in Goes and played 79 international matches for the Netherlands as a defender. During her international career, she scored one goal.

Veenstra was a member of the Netherlands squad that won the bronze medal at the 2000 Summer Olympics in Sydney. She made her first international appearance on 6 February 1997 in a friendly against South Africa. Her last match for the Dutch Women's Team came on 29 September 2000, when they faced Spain (2-0) during the bronze medal match at the Sydney Olympics.

External links
 

1975 births
Living people
Dutch female field hockey players
Field hockey players at the 2000 Summer Olympics
Medalists at the 2000 Summer Olympics
Olympic bronze medalists for the Netherlands
Olympic field hockey players of the Netherlands
Olympic medalists in field hockey
Sportspeople from Goes